Ohr Somayach, Monsey (officially titled the Ohr Somayach Tanenbaum Educational Center) was an accredited  men's college of Judaic studies offering both full and part-time programs.

Its curriculum was designed to provide students with an appreciation for and understanding of classical Jewish texts and Jewish philosophy and from an Orthodox Jewish perspective.

In addition, the yeshiva ran an outreach program called Legacy Retreats and hosted family getaways and retreats in its Beit Shvidler Conference center.

History 
In 1977, the Ohr Somayach yeshiva in Jerusalem, Israel established an American campus in Yonkers, New York. After two years, Rabbi Ezriel Tauber together with a group of lay leaders purchased land in Monsey, New York to service a full-time Judaic learning center.

They maintained the name Ohr Somayach and enlisted Rabbi Israel Rokowsky as dean.

As of 2019, Ohr Somayach has ceased operating as a yeshiva.  However, under the leadership of Ohr Somayach alumnus Rabbi Yosef Simon, and under the guidance of some of the former leadership of Ohr Somayach, a new organization called Toras Dovid now operates a yeshiva for ba'alei tshuva, as well as a kollel for ba'alei tshuva.

Administration
Isaac Rokowsky
Abraham Rokowsky
David Wechsler
Rabbi Israel Rokowsky, co-Rosh Yeshiva emeritus 
Rabbi Yisroel Simcha Schorr, co-Rosh Yeshiva emeritus
Rabbi Avraham Braun, Menahel emeritus 
Rabbi Naftali Reich

Student body
The student body used to come from across North America and most countries with a Jewish population. 
For many students, Ohr Somayach was their first exposure to full-time Jewish and Torah study. For more advanced students, higher-level classes were offered with the aim of acquiring the skills for self-sufficient Talmud study.

Campus
The yeshiva is located in Monsey, New York on a  campus which includes a beit midrash and a residence facility. The adjacent Beit Shvidler complex (a 40000 sq ft retreat and conference center) houses the Ohra VeSimcha family retreats .

Monsey is home to a Haredi community whose residents often provided students with Shabbat hospitality.

See also
Ohr Somayach, Jerusalem, its counterpart in Israel
Baal teshuva
Yeshiva

References

External links

1977 establishments in New York (state)
Baalei teshuva institutions
Educational institutions established in 1977
Haredi Judaism in New York (state)
Monsey, New York
Ohr Somayach
Orthodox yeshivas in Monsey, New York